The Seattle Mariners 2003 season was their 27th since the franchise creation. The team finished 2nd in the American League West with a record of 93-69.

The team used only five starting pitchers the entire season, which was unusual. The five starting pitchers were Ryan Franklin, Freddy Garcia, Gil Meche, Jamie Moyer and Joel Piñeiro.

Offseason
 October 11, 2002: Scott Podsednik was selected off waivers by the Milwaukee Brewers from the Seattle Mariners.
 November 15, 2002: Mariners named Bob Melvin, as the team's new manager, after Lou Piniella left to manage the Tampa Bay Devil Rays.
 December 6, 2002: John Olerud was signed as a free agent with the Seattle Mariners.
January 16, 2003: John Mabry was signed as a free agent with the Seattle Mariners.

Regular season

Opening Day starters
Bret Boone
Mike Cameron
Jeff Cirillo
Carlos Guillén
Mark McLemore
Jamie Moyer
John Olerud
Ichiro Suzuki
Dan Wilson
Randy Winn

Season standings

Record vs. opponents

Notable transactions
July 29, 2003: Kenny Kelly was traded by the Seattle Mariners to the New York Mets for Rey Sánchez and cash.

Roster

Player stats

Batting

Starters by position
Note: Pos = Position; G = Games played; AB = At bats; H = Hits; Avg. = Batting average; HR = Home runs; RBI = Runs batted in

Other batters
Note: G = Games played; AB = At bats; H = Hits; Avg. = Batting average; HR = Home runs; RBI = Runs batted in

Pitching

Starting pitchers
Note; G = Games pitched; IP = Innings pitched; W = Wins; L = Losses; ERA = Earned run average; SO = Strikeouts

Relief pitchers
Note; G = Games pitched; W = Wins; L = Losses; SV = Saves; ERA = Earned run average; SO = Strikeouts

Awards and honors
 Jamie Moyer, Pitcher, Roberto Clemente Award
 Jamie Moyer, Hutch Award
2003 Major League Baseball All-Star Game

Farm system

LEAGUE CHAMPIONS: San Antonio, Inland Empire

Major League Baseball Draft 

The following is a list of 2003 Seattle Mariners draft picks. The Mariners took part in both the Rule 4 draft (June amateur draft) and the Rule 5 draft. The Mariners made 53 selections in the 2003 draft, the first being shortstop Adam Jones in the first round. In all, the Mariners selected 30 pitchers, 8 outfielders, 6 catchers, 4 shortstops, 4 third basemen, and 1 first baseman.

Draft

Key

Table

Rule 5 draft

Key

Table

References

External links
2003 Seattle Mariners at Baseball Reference
2003 Seattle Mariners team page at www.baseball-almanac.com

Seattle Mariners seasons
Seattle Mariners season
2003 in sports in Washington (state)